Carlos Loredo (14 October 1951 – 17 June 1998) was a Cuban footballer. He competed in the men's tournament at the 1980 Summer Olympics.

References

External links
 

1951 births
1998 deaths
Cuban footballers
Cuba international footballers
Association football forwards
FC Ciudad de La Habana players
Olympic footballers of Cuba
Footballers at the 1980 Summer Olympics
Pan American Games medalists in football
Pan American Games silver medalists for Cuba
Footballers at the 1979 Pan American Games
Place of birth missing
Medalists at the 1979 Pan American Games